Kolamba Sanniya Returns is a 2018 Sri Lankan Sinhala comedy film directed by Harsha Udakanda and co-produced by Sahan Abeywardena, Shermal Dilshan and Dinith Cornett. It stars Sarath Kothalawala and Menaka Maduwanthi in lead roles along with Rajitha Hiran and Kumuduni Adikari. Music composed by Gayan Udawaththa. It is the remake of 1976 film Kolamba Sanniya by Manik Sandrasagara. It is the 1312th Sri Lankan film in the Sinhala cinema.

Plot

Cast
 Sarath Kothalawala as Andiris
 Menaka Maduwanthi		
 Sanet Dikkumbura as Jacolis	
 Rajitha Hiran as Hichcha
 Kumuduni Adikari		
 Rohan Wijetunga as Mustafa	
 Ashika Mathasinghe as Ahinsa	
 Gayathri Kanchanamali		
 Rasika Nimali		
 Boniface Jayasantha as Chaminda Niriwasthara
 D.B. Gangodathenna as Man at shopping complex
 Harindu Perera as Harry

Soundtrack
The film contain only one song. This lyrics is written by Karunaratne Abeysekera including 'Saradham' where sung by N.M Raja and Jamuna Rani.

References

External links
 
 Kolamba Sanniya Returns on YouTube
 Kolomba Sanniya Returns Film Premier
 Kolamba Sanniya Returns Film Behind The Scenes
 Now Showing Nationwide Film Teaser

2018 films
2010s Sinhala-language films
Remakes of Sri Lankan films